Graphandra is a genus of flowering plants belonging to the family Acanthaceae.

Its native range is Indo-China.

Species:
 Graphandra procumbens Imlay

References

Acanthaceae
Acanthaceae genera